Sergey Demchenko (born 2 May 1974) is a Belarusian wrestler. He competed in the men's freestyle 69 kg at the 2000 Summer Olympics.

References

External links
 

1974 births
Living people
Belarusian male sport wrestlers
Olympic wrestlers of Belarus
Wrestlers at the 2000 Summer Olympics
Sportspeople from Gomel